Auguste Bottée de Toulmon (15 May 1797 – 22 March 1850) was a 19th-century French composer and musicologist.

Biography 
A polytechnician (1817), he had to leave the École polytechnique for health reason and became a lawyer (1823) then decided to devote himself to music. A student of Cherubini and Reicha, he became librarian at the Conservatoire de Paris (1831–1846).

He was the son of inventor Auguste Bottée de Toulmon (1764–1816).

Works

Compositions 
He is the author of several masses, one oratorio and one opéra comique.

Musicology 
He wrote numerous texts on musical archaeology.
1836: De la chanson française au Moyen Age
1838: Des puys de palinods au Moyen Age
1844: Dissertation sur les instruments de musique employés au moyen âge.
1857: Instructions sur la musique

Bibliography 
 Notice sur la vie et les travaux de M. Auguste Bottée de Toulmon: Read online
 Tilman Seebass, De l'image à l'objet : la méthode critique en iconographie, 1988, p. 36

References

External links 
 Notice du CTHS (Comité des travaux historiques et scientifiques)
 Bottée de Toulmon, Auguste 1797-1850 on http://socialarchive.iath.virginia.edu (en icon)
 BOTTEE DE TOULMON Auguste on CTHS
 Notice sur la vie et les travaux de M. Auguste Bottée de Toulmon on Gallica
 Manuscrit, Lettre de l'abbé Joseph Baini à Auguste Bottée de Toulmon on Gallica 

19th-century French musicologists
19th-century French composers
1797 births
Writers from Paris
Musicians from Paris
1850 deaths
19th-century musicologists